The emerging church is a Christian Protestant movement of the late 20th and early 21st centuries that crosses a number of theological boundaries: participants are variously described as Protestant, post-Protestant, evangelical, post-evangelical, liberal, post-liberal, progressive, socially liberal, anabaptist,  Reformed, charismatic, neocharismatic, and post-charismatic. Emerging churches can be found throughout the globe, predominantly in North America, Brazil, Western Europe, Australia, New Zealand, and Africa.

Proponents believe the movement transcends the "modernist" labels of "conservative" and "liberal," calling the movement a "conversation" to emphasize its developing and decentralized nature, its vast range of standpoints, and its commitment to dialogue. Participants seek to live their faith in what they believe to be a "postmodern" society.  What those involved in the conversation mostly agree on is their disillusionment with the organized and institutional church and their support for the deconstruction of modern Christian worship, modern evangelism, and the nature of modern Christian community.  A departure of this movement is the development of progressive Christianity.

Definitions

Terminology
Emerging churches are fluid, hard to define, and varied; they contrast themselves with what has gone before in referring to the latter as the "inherited church." Key themes of the emerging church are couched in the language of reform, praxis-oriented lifestyles, post-evangelical thought, and incorporation or acknowledgment of political and postmodern elements.
Terminological confusion has occurred because of the use of words with similar etymology. When used as descriptors, "emerging" and "emergent" can be interchangeable. However, when used as names, they are different. In this case "Emerging" refers to the whole informal, church-based, global movement, while "Emergent" to a formal, organisational subset associated with Tony Jones, Brian McLaren, Doug Pagitt, and others: the "Emergent stream."

Variety and debate
Mark Driscoll and Ed Stetzer described three categories within the movement: Relevants, Reconstructionists, and Revisionists.

Relevants are theological conservatives who are interested in updating to current culture. They look to people like Dan Kimball and Donald Miller.

Reconstructionists are generally theologically evangelical, and speak of new forms of church that result in transformed lives. They look to Neil Cole, Michael Frost and Alan Hirsch.

Revisionists are theologically liberal, and openly question whether evangelical doctrine is appropriate for the postmodern world.  They look to leaders such as Brian McLaren, Rob Bell and Doug Pagitt.

Driscoll has subsequently identified a fourth stream, the house church movement, which he previously included under the Reconstructionist label. Driscoll and Scot McKnight have now voiced concerns over Brian McLaren and the "emergent thread."  Some evangelical leaders such as Shane Claiborne have also sought to distance themselves from the emerging church movement, its labels and the "emergent brand."

History
According to Mobsby the term "emerging church" was first used in 1970, when Larson and Osborne predicted a movement characterised by: contextual and experimental mission; new forms of church; the removal of barriers and division; a blend of evangelism and social action; attention to both experience and tradition; the breakdown of clergy/laity distinctions. The Catholic political theologian, Johann Baptist Metz, used the term emergent church in 1981 in a different context. Marcus Borg says: "The emerging paradigm has been visible for well over a hundred years. In the last twenty to thirty years, it has become a major grassroots movement among both laity and clergy in 'mainline' or 'old mainline' Protestant denominations."  He describes it as: "a way of seeing the Bible (and the Christian tradition as a whole) as historical, metaphorical, and sacramental, [and] a way of seeing the Christian life as relational and transformational."

The history of the emerging church that preceded the US Emergent organization began with Mike Riddell and Mark Pierson in New Zealand from 1989, and with a number of practitioners in the UK including Jonny Baker, Ian Mobsby, Kevin, Ana and Brian Draper, and Sue Wallace amongst others, from around 1992. The influence of the Nine O'Clock Service has been ignored also, owing to its notoriety, yet much that was practised there was influential on early proponents of alternative worship.

Common to the identity of many of these emerging-church projects that began in Australia, New Zealand and the United Kingdom, is their development with very little central planning on behalf of the established denominations. They occurred as the initiative of particular groups wanting to start new contextual church experiments, and are therefore very "bottom up." Murray says that these churches began in a spontaneous way, with informal relationships formed between otherwise independent groups and that many became churches as a development from their initial more modest beginnings.

Values and characteristics

Trinitarian based values
Gibbs and Bolger interviewed a number of people involved in leading emerging churches and from this research have identified some core values in the emerging church, including desires to imitate the life of Jesus; transform secular society; emphasize communal living; welcome outsiders; be generous and creative; and lead without control. Ian Mobsby suggests Trinitarian Ecclesiology is the basis of these shared international values.

Mobsby also suggests that the Emerging Church is centered on a combination of models of Church and of Contextual Theology that draw on this Trinitarian base: the Mystical Communion and Sacramental models of Church, and the Synthetic and Transcendent models of Contextual Theology.

According to Mobsby, the Emerging Church has reacted to the missional needs of postmodern culture and re-acquired a Trinitarian basis to its understanding of Church as Worship, Mission and Community. He argues this movement is over and against some forms of conservative evangelicalism and other reformed ecclesiologies since the enlightenment that have neglected the Trinity, which has caused problems with certainty, judgementalism and fundamentalism and the increasing gap between the Church and contemporary culture.

Post-Christendom mission and evangelism
Members of the movement often place a high value on good works or social activism, including missional living. According to Stuart Murray, Christendom is the creation and maintenance of a Christian nation by ensuring a close relationship of power between the Christian Church and its host culture. Today, churches may still attempt to use this power in mission and evangelism.  The emerging church considers this to be unhelpful. Murray summarizes Christendom values as: a commitment to hierarchy and the status quo; the loss of lay involvement; institutional values rather than community focus; church at the centre of society rather than the margins; the use of political power to bring in the Kingdom; religious compulsion; punitive rather than restorative justice; marginalisation of women, the poor, and dissident movements; inattentiveness to the criticisms of those outraged by the historic association of Christianity with patriarchy, warfare, injustice and patronage; partiality for respectability and top-down mission; attractional evangelism; assuming the Christian story is known; and a preoccupation with the rich and powerful.

The emerging church seeks a post-Christendom approach to being church and mission through: renouncing imperialistic approaches to language and cultural imposition; making 'truth claims' with humility and respect; overcoming the public/private dichotomy; moving church from the center to the margins; moving from a place of privilege in society to one voice amongst many; a transition from control to witness, maintenance to mission and institution to movement. 

In the face of criticism, some in the emerging church respond that it is important to attempt a "both and" approach to redemptive and incarnational theologies. Some Evangelicals and Fundamentalists are perceived as "overly redemptive" and therefore in danger of condemning people by communicating the Good News in aggressive and angry ways. A more loving and affirming approach is proposed in the context of post-modernity where distrust may occur in response to power claims.  It is suggested that this can form the basis of a constructive engagement with 21st-century post-industrial western cultures. According to Ian Mobsby, the suggestion that the emerging church is mainly focused on deconstruction and the rejection of current forms of church should itself be rejected.

Postmodern worldview and hermeneutics
The emerging church is a response to the perceived influence of modernism in Western Christianity. As some sociologists commented on a cultural shift that they believed to correspond to postmodern ways of perceiving reality in the late 20th century, some Christians began to advocate changes within the church in response. These Christians saw the contemporary church as being culturally bound to modernism. They changed their practices to relate to the new cultural situation. Emerging Christians began to challenge the modern church on issues such as: institutional structures, systematic theology, propositional teaching methods, a perceived preoccupation with buildings, an attractional understanding of mission, professional clergy, and a perceived preoccupation with the political process and unhelpful jargon ("Christian-ese").

As a result, some in the emerging church believe it is necessary to deconstruct modern Christian dogma. One way this happens is by engaging in dialogue, rather than proclaiming a predigested message, believing that this leads people to Jesus through the Holy Spirit on their own terms. Many in the movement embrace the missiology that drives the movement in an effort to be like Christ and make disciples by being a good example. The emerging church movement contains a great diversity in beliefs and practices, although some have adopted a preoccupation with sacred rituals, good works, and political and social activism. Much of the Emerging Church movement has also adopted the approach to evangelism which stressed peer-to-peer dialogue rather than dogmatic proclamation and proselytizing.

A plurality of Scriptural interpretations is acknowledged in the emerging church movement. Participants in the movement exhibit a particular concern for the effect of the modern reader's cultural context on the act of interpretation echoing the ideas of postmodern thinkers such as Jacques Derrida and Stanley Fish. Therefore a narrative approach to Scripture, and history are emphasized in some emerging churches over exegetical and dogmatic approaches (such as that found in systematic theology and systematic exegesis), which are often viewed as reductionist. Others embrace a multiplicity of approaches.

Generous orthodoxy
Spearheaded by Brian McLaren, some emerging church leaders see interfaith dialogue as a means to share their narratives as they learn from the narratives of others. Some Emerging Church Christians believe there are radically diverse perspectives within Christianity that are valuable for humanity to progress toward truth and a better resulting relationship with God, and that these different perspectives deserve Christian charity rather than condemnation. Reformed and evangelical opponents, like John MacArthur, do not believe that such generosity is appropriate, citing the movement's shift away from traditional evangelical beliefs such as eternal punishment and penal substitution towards a reintroduction of, for example, elements of ancient mysticism.

Centered set
Movement leaders such as Rob Bell appropriate set theory as a means of understanding a basic change in the way the Christian church thinks about itself as a group. Set theory is a concept in mathematics that allows an understanding of what numbers belong to a group, or set.  A bounded set would describe a group with clear "in" and "out" definitions of membership.  The Christian church has largely organized itself as a bounded set, those who share the same beliefs and values are in the set and those who disagree are outside.

The centered set does not limit membership to pre-conceived boundaries. Instead a centered set is conditioned on a centered point.  Membership is contingent on those who are moving toward that point. Elements moving toward a particular point are part of the set, but elements moving away from that point are not. As a centered-set Christian membership would be dependent on moving toward the central point of Jesus.  Christians are then defined by their focus and movement toward Christ rather than a limited set of shared beliefs and values.

John Wimber utilized the centered set understanding of membership in his Vineyard Churches. The centered set theory of Christian Churches came largely from missional anthropologist Paul Hiebert. The centered set understanding of membership allows for a clear vision of the focal point, the ability to move toward that point without being tied down to smaller diversions, a sense of total egalitarianism with respect for differing opinions, and an authority moved from individual members to the existing center.

Authenticity and conversation
The movement favors the sharing of experiences via testimonies, prayer, group recitation, sharing meals and other communal practices, which they believe are more personal and sincere than propositional presentations of the Gospel. Teachers in the emerging church tend to view the Bible and its stories through a lens which they believe finds significance and meaning for their community's social and personal stories rather than for the purpose of finding cross-cultural, propositional absolutes regarding salvation and conduct.

The emerging church claims they are creating a safe environment for those with opinions ordinarily rejected within modern conservative evangelicalism and fundamentalism. Non-critical, interfaith dialog is preferred over dogmatically-driven evangelism in the movement. Story and narrative replaces the dogmatic:

Those in the movement do not engage in aggressive apologetics or confrontational evangelism in the traditional sense, preferring to encourage the freedom to discover truth through conversation and relationships with the Christian community.

The limits of interreligious conversation were tested in 2006 Emergent Village coordinator Tony Jones co-convened the first encounter of Emergent church and "Jewish emergent" leaders in a meeting co-hosted by Synagogue 3000, a Jewish nonprofit group. Emergent church scholar Ryan Bolger documented the meeting in a scholarly article co-authored with one of the organizers, while Jones recounted the episode, which had drawn criticism from conservative Christians, in his book The New Christians: Dispatches from the Emergent Frontier.

Missional living
While some Evangelicals emphasize eternal salvation, many in the emerging church emphasize the here and now. Participants in this movement assert that the incarnation of Christ informs their theology. They believe that as God entered the world in human form, adherents enter (individually and communally) into the context around them and aim to transform that culture through local involvement. This holistic involvement may take many forms, including social activism, hospitality and acts of kindness. This beneficent involvement in culture is part of what is called missional living. Missional living leads to a focus on temporal and social issues, in contrast with a perceived evangelical overemphasis on salvation. Drawing on research and models of contextual theology, Mobsby asserts that the emerging church is using different models of contextual theology than conservative evangelicals, who tend to use a "translation" model of contextual theology (which has been criticized for being colonialist and condescending toward other cultures); the emerging church tends to use a "synthetic" or "transcendent" model of contextual theology.  The emerging church has charged many conservative evangelical churches with withdrawal from involvement in contextual mission and seeking the contextualization of the gospel.

Many emerging churches have put a strong emphasis on contextualization and, therefore, contextual theology.  Contextual theology has been defined as "A way of doing theology in which one takes into account: the spirit and message of the gospel; the tradition of the Christian people; the culture in which one is theologising; and social change in that culture." Emerging churches, drawing on this synthetic (or transcendent) model of contextual theology, seek to have a high view towards the Bible, the Christian people, culture, humanity and justice.  It is this "both...and" approach that distinguishes contextual theology.

Emerging communities participate in social action, community involvement, global justice and sacrificial hospitality in an effort to know and share God's grace. At a conference entitled "The Emerging Church Forum" in 2006, John Franke said “The Church of Jesus Christ is not the goal of the Gospel, just the instrument of the extension of God’s mission.” “The Church has been slow to recognize that missions isn’t (sic) a program the Church administers, it is the very core of the Church’s reason for being.” This focus on missional living and practicing radical hospitality has led many emerging churches to deepen what they are doing by developing a rhythm of life, and a vision of missional loving engagement with the world.

Communitarian or egalitarian ecclesiology
Proponents of the movement communicate and interact through fluid and open networks because the movement is decentralized with little institutional coordination. Because of the participation values named earlier, being community through participation affects the governance of most Emerging Churches. Participants avoid power relationships, attempting to gather in ways specific to their local context. In this way some in the movement share with the house church movements a willingness to challenge traditional church structures/organizations though they also respect the different expressions of traditional Christian denominations.

International research suggests that some Emerging Churches are utilizing a Trinitarian basis to being church through what Avery Dulles calls 'The Mystical Communion Model of Church'.
 Not an institution but a fraternity (or sorority).
 Church as interpersonal community.
 Church as a fellowship of persons – a fellowship of people with God and with one another in Christ.
 Connects strongly with the mystical 'body of Christ' as a communion of the spiritual life of faith, hope and charity.
 Resonates with Aquinas' notion of the Church as the principle of unity that dwells in Christ and in us, binding us together and in him.
 All the external means of grace, (sacraments, scripture, laws etc.) are secondary and subordinate; their role is simply to dispose people for an interior union with God effected by grace.

Dulles sees the strength in this approach being acceptable to both Protestant and Catholic:

Creative and rediscovered spirituality
This can involve everything from expressive, neocharismatic style of worship and the use of contemporary music and films to more ancient liturgical customs and eclectic expressions of spirituality, with the goal of making the church gathering reflect the local community's tastes.

Emerging church practitioners are happy to take elements of worship from a wide variety of historic traditions, including traditions of the Catholic Church, the Anglican churches, the Eastern Orthodox churches, and Celtic Christianity. From these and other religious traditions emerging church groups take, adapt and blend various historic church practices including liturgy, prayer beads, icons, spiritual direction, the labyrinth, and lectio divina. The Emerging Church is also sometimes called the "Ancient-Future" church.

One of the key social drives in Western Post-industrialised countries, is the rise in new/old forms of mysticism. This rise in spirituality appears to be driven by the effects of consumerism, globalisation and advances in information technology.  Therefore, the Emerging Church is operating in a new context of postmodern spirituality, as a new form of mysticism.  This capitalizes on the social shift in starting assumptions from the situation that most are regarded as materialist/atheist (the modern position), to the fact that many people now believe in and are searching for something more spiritual (postmodern view).  This has been characterised as a major shift from religion to spirituality.

So, in the new world of 'spiritual tourism', the Emerging Church Movement is seeking to missionally assist people to shift from being spiritual tourists to Christian pilgrims.  Many are drawing on ancient Christian resources recontextualised into the contemporary such as contemplation and contemplative forms of prayer, symbolic multi-sensory worship, story telling and many others.  This again has required a change in focus as the majority of unchurched and dechurched people are seeking 'something that works' rather than something that is 'true'.

Use of new technologies
Emerging-church groups use the Internet as a medium of decentralized communication.  Church websites are used as announcement boards for community activity, and they are generally a hub for more participation based new technologies such as blogs, Facebook groups, Twitter accounts, etc.  The use of the blog is an especially popular and appropriate means of communication within the Emerging church.  Through blogs, members converse about theology, philosophy, art, culture, politics, and social justice, both among their local congregations and across the broader Emerging community.  These blogs can be seen to embrace both sacred and secular culture side-by-side as an excellent example of the church's focus on contextual theology.

Morality and justice
Drawing on a more 'Missional Morality' that again turns to the synoptic gospels of Christ, many emerging-church groups draw on an understanding of God seeking to restore all things back into restored relationship.  This emphasises God's graceful love approach to discipleship, in following Christ who identified with the socially excluded and ill, in opposition to the Pharisees and Sadducees and their purity rules.

Under this movement, traditional Christians' emphasis on either individual salvation, end-times theology or the prosperity gospel have been challenged. Many people in the movement express concern for what they consider to be the practical manifestation of God's kingdom on earth, by which they mean social justice. This concern manifests itself in a variety of ways depending on the local community and in ways they believe transcend "modernist" labels of "conservative" and "liberal." This concern for justice is expressed in such things as feeding the poor, visiting the sick and prisoners, stopping contemporary slavery, critiquing systemic and coercive power structures with "postcolonial hermeneutics," and working for environmental causes.

Parallels in other religions
Drawing on the success of Christian emerging church movements, a 'Jewish Emergent' movement has come into being, often conducting dialogue with evangelical Christian emergent movements. Synagogue 3000 describes its mission as "challenging and promising alternatives to traditional synagogue structures"—participants in the movement conduct worship outside of a traditional synagogue environment and attempt to engage with non-practising Jews.

See also

Alternative worship
Christian contemplation
Christian revival
Ecumenism

Inculturation
Missio Dei
Postmodern Christianity
Progressive Christianity
Pub church

References

External links
Postmodernity and the Emerging Church Movement: Reading Room: Extensive online resources on the Emerging Church Movement, Tyndale University College and Seminary
The Emerging Church, Part One July 8, 2005, PBS Religion & Ethics NewsWeekly. Retrieved July 29, 2005.
The Emerging Church, Part Two July 15, 2005, PBS Religion & Ethics NewsWeekly. Retrieved July 29, 2005.
What is the Emerging Church? – 2006 guest lecture by Dr. Scot McKnight at Westminster Theological Seminary
Five Streams of the Emerging Church – Christianity Today article by Scot McKnight
The Emergent Mystique – Christianity Today feature by Andy Crouch
What Should We Think of the Emerging Church? Part One – Christian Post column by Albert Mohler
What Should We Think of the Emerging Church? Part Two – Christian Post column by Albert Mohler
An Interview with Tony Jones, National Coordinator of Emergent Village
"Will the Real Emerger Please Stand Up?" by C. Michael Patton, President of Credo House Ministries

 
Missional Christianity
Christian movements
Christian terminology
Postmodern religion
Evangelical movement
Trinitarianism